This is the list of currencies presently in circulation in Asia.

Asian currencies

See also

List of circulating currencies

References

External links
International Organization for Standardization (ISO)

Asia